Mì Quảng  (also spelled mỳ Quảng), literally "Quảng noodle", is a Vietnamese noodle dish that originated from Quảng Nam Province in central Vietnam. In the region, it is one of the most popular and nationally recognized food items, and served on various occasions such as at family parties, death anniversaries, and Tết. Mì Quảng can both be found in many famous restaurants and street vendors among Central provinces, and is eaten for breakfast and lunch.

Ingredients and serving

The main ingredients of mì quảng are rice noodles, meat, and herbs, most commonly served with a small amount of broth, which is generally infused with turmeric. Wide rice noodles are placed atop of a bed of fresh herbs in a bowl (or vice versa), and then warm or lukewarm broth and meat are added. The broth is usually strongly flavored and only a small amount of it is used, generally enough to partially cover the vegetables.

Meats used in the dish may include one or more of the following: shrimp, pork, chicken, or even fish or beef. The broth is made by simmering the meat in water or bone broth for a more intense flavor, seasoned with fish sauce, black pepper, shallot and garlic. Turmeric is often added to the broth, giving it a yellowish color.

As with many Vietnamese dishes, Mì quảng is served with fresh herbs; commonly used herbs include basil, cilantro ( or ), scallions or onion leaves, Vietnamese coriander, sliced banana flower (bắp chuối bào), and lettuce. A variety of other herbs may also be used in mì quảng, including common knotgrass, water mint, perilla, and heartleaf.

Mì Quảng is commonly garnished with peanuts and toasted sesame rice crackers called , which sets the dish apart from other noodle dishes. Additional ingredients may include hard-boiled quail eggs, steamed pork sausage, or shredded pork rinds. Lime juice and fresh chili peppers are often used as an added seasoning; other seasonings may include soy sauce or chili sauce.

Mì quảng can also be served without broth, as a salad.

Cultural aspects
There is a Vietnamese saying about this dish:

This couplet describes a girl from Quảng Nam, a province on Vietnam's South Central Coast, who warmly invites her lover to drink a cup of tea and a bowl of mì Quảng, to show him the depth of her love for him.

See also
Vietnamese noodles
Vietnamese cuisine
Cao lau
Rice noodles

Notes

References
 
 
 

Culture in Da Nang
Vietnamese noodle dishes